Aguado may refer to:

People 
Aguado is a Spanish surname. Notable people with the surname include:

Alexandre Marie Aguado, Spanish banker
Dionisio Aguado, Spanish classical guitarist and composer
José Sanz Aguado, Spanish chess master
Xavier Aguado, Spanish footballer

Others 
 Aguado, a Brazilian bread roll

Spanish-language surnames